is a railway station in the city of  Namerikawa, Toyama, Japan, operated by the private railway operator Toyama Chihō Railway.

Lines

Station layout 
The station has one ground-level island platform serving two tracks, connected to the wooden station building by a level crossing. The station is staffed on weekdays.

Platforms

History
Naka-Namerikawa Station was opened on 28 February 1914.

Adjacent stations

Passenger statistics
In fiscal 2015, the station was used by 770 passengers daily.

Surrounding area 
Namerikawa City Hall
Namerikawa Post Office

See also
 List of railway stations in Japan

References

External links

 

Railway stations in Toyama Prefecture
Railway stations in Japan opened in 1914
Stations of Toyama Chihō Railway
Namerikawa, Toyama